Julien Koszul (4 December 1844 – 15 January 1927) was a French composer and pipe organist from Alsace.

Biography
Born in Morschwiller-le-Bas, Alsace, Koszul studied at the École Niedermeyer de Paris with Camille Saint-Saëns, together with Gabriel Fauré and Eugène Gigout as fellow students and friends.

He moved to Roubaix, where he took the direction of the National Conservatory of Music. He encouraged Albert Roussel to undertake an artistic career.

Composer Henri Dutilleux and mathematician Jean-Louis Koszul were his grandsons. Henri Dutilleux, who often recalled his memory, paid tribute to him in 2005 by being the originator of the publication of his correspondence.

Koszul died in Douai.

Selected compositions 
 1872: Deux Mélodies, poem by Charles Manso
 1873: Romanzette pour piano. No 1, In E ♭, N ° 2, in C
 1875: Puisque mai tout en fleurs ! Mélodie: No 1 contralto, baritone or mezzo-soprano
 1877: Aubade! Mélody for tenor, lyric by Charles Manso
 1879: S'il est un charmant Gazon !, poem by Victor Hugo
 1879: Bonsoir, Madeleine! lullaby for soprano or tenor, poem  by Marc Mounier
 1879: Sonnet!, poem by Marc Monnier
 1893: Cantate Nadaud, for solis, choir and military and symphonic orchesters, poem by Jules Rosoor ; score (piano and voice), Tourcoing : Rosoor-Delattre, (Bibliothèque nationale de France)
 1902: Quo vadis! scène chorale, ..., poem by Jules Rosoor (Bibliothèque nationale de France)
 1925: Yvonnette, little Walloon waltz, for piano
 Première Valse (recording)

References

External links 
 Qui est Julien Koszul ? on ResMusica
  S'il est un charmant Gazon ! / music by Julien Koszul on Gallica
 Julien Koszul on BBC Music
 Julien Koszul on WorldCat

1844 births
1927 deaths
19th-century French composers
19th-century French male musicians
20th-century French composers
20th-century French male musicians
French classical organists
French male organists
French people of Polish descent
French Romantic composers
People from Haut-Rhin
Male classical organists